Sir Allen Montgomery Lewis  (26 October 1909 – 18 February 1993) was a Saint Lucian barrister and public servant who twice served as the country's Governor-General.

Early life 
He was born in Castries and was educated at the Castries Anglican Infant and Primary Schools and Saint Mary's College, Castries. He then studied law at London University and the Middle Temple.

He became a member of Castries City Council in 1941, acting as Chairman six times. He was one of the founders and the first president of the Saint Lucia Labour Party in 1950. Before his appointments to the viceregal post, Sir Allen sat on the legislative council (1943–1951) and was a senator in the Federal Parliament of the West Indies Federation (1958–1959).

Allen had a distinguished legal career alongside his political accomplishments; he was a judge on the Jamaican Court of Appeal (1962–1967) and the first Chief Justice of the West Indies Associated States Supreme Court (1967–1972). In 1975 he became Chancellor of the University of the West Indies.

In 1972 he returned to Saint Lucia and spent two years establishing a National Development Corporation to develop the economy of the island, after which he was appointed Governor of Saint Lucia, the Queen's representative. When St Lucia gained independence in 1979 he served twice in the equivalent role as Governor-General of Saint Lucia (1979–1980 and 1982–1987).

His brother, W. Arthur Lewis, won the Nobel Memorial Prize in Economics for his work on developing countries and the "Lewis turning point."

Honours and awards 
 1952 Awarded the Coronation Medal. 
 1968 Made Knight Bachelor. 
 1975 Made a Knight of the Order of Saint John of Jerusalem. 
 1977 Awarded the Jubilee Medal.
 1979 Made a Knight Grand Cross of the Order of Saint Michael and Saint George (GCMG).
 1985 Awarded the Grand Cross of the Royal Victorian Order (GCVO). 
 1974 Awarded honorary degree of Doctor of Laws by the University of the West Indies.

References 

 Biography (Saint Lucia Government House)

External links
Governors General of Saint Lucia
Civics

1909 births
1993 deaths
Alumni of University of London Worldwide
Members of the Middle Temple
Knights Grand Cross of the Order of St Michael and St George
Knights Grand Cross of the Royal Victorian Order
Grand Cross of the Order of Saint Lucia
Knights of the Order of St John
People associated with the University of the West Indies
Governors-General of Saint Lucia
Saint Lucian judges
Saint Lucian judges on the courts of Jamaica
Chief justices of the Eastern Caribbean Supreme Court
20th-century Saint Lucian lawyers
Governors of British Saint Lucia
People from Castries Quarter
Saint Lucian judges of international courts and tribunals
Members of the Federal Parliament of the West Indies Federation